Nicolae Istrate (born 24 October 1982) is a Romanian bobsledder who has competed since 2000. Competing in two Winter Olympics, he earned his best finish of 11th in the two-man event at Vancouver in 2010.

At the FIBT World Championships, Istrate earned his best finish of 8th in the two-man event at Königssee in 2011.
He used to be a decathlete for the Romanian Team. Istrate is married with Diana Dumitrescu who is an athlete as well.

External links 
 
 
 
 

1982 births
Bobsledders at the 2006 Winter Olympics
Bobsledders at the 2010 Winter Olympics
Bobsledders at the 2014 Winter Olympics
Living people
Olympic bobsledders of Romania
Romanian male bobsledders